James Dorman Weaver (September 27, 1920 – November 15, 2003) was a Republican member of the U.S. House of Representatives from Pennsylvania, and a colonel in the United States Air Force before being posthumously promoted to brigadier general.

Weaver was born in Erie, Pennsylvania to Clara B. (née Sharp) and Dorman Weaver, both Canadian immigrants.  He attended the Erie Conservatory of Music and Syracuse University in Syracuse, New York from 1938 to 1941.  He graduated from the Medical School of the University of Pennsylvania in Philadelphia in 1944.  While a student he worked on farms in Erie County, Pennsylvania and as an orchestral trombonist.  He entered the United States Army Medical Corps in 1946 and served as captain, commanding officer and chief of surgery of the Three Hundred and Eighty-second Station Hospital in Ascom City, Korea, from 1947 to 1948.  After his military service, Weaver practiced medicine in Erie from 1948 to 1962.  Weaver was a Pennsylvania delegate to White House Conference on Aging in 1961 and served as medical administrator for the  Pennsylvania Bureau of Vocational Rehabilitation from 1960 to 1962. Weaver served as a medical consultant to the Warren Commission.  He was elected as a Republican to the 88th Congress, but was an unsuccessful candidate for reelection in 1964.  He returned to active duty with the United States Air Force from 1965 to 1983.  He died in Sterling, Virginia, and is buried in Arlington National Cemetery.

Weaver was posthumously promoted to brigadier general on July 12, 2008.

Sources

References

1920 births
2003 deaths
20th-century American politicians
American people of Canadian descent
American trombonists
Male trombonists
Burials at Arlington National Cemetery
Perelman School of Medicine at the University of Pennsylvania alumni
Politicians from Erie, Pennsylvania
Syracuse University alumni
United States Air Force generals
United States Air Force Medical Corps officers
United States Army Medical Corps officers
Republican Party members of the United States House of Representatives from Pennsylvania
20th-century trombonists
20th-century American male musicians
Military personnel from Pennsylvania